Pēteris Juraševskis (23 March 1872, in Sesava parish – 10 January 1945) held the office of Prime Minister of Latvia from 24 January 1928 – 30 November 1928. He was the Minister of Finance from January 1928 to March 1928.

References

1872 births
1945 deaths
People from Jelgava Municipality
People from Courland Governorate
Russian Constitutional Democratic Party members
Workers' Party (Latvia) politicians
Democratic Centre (Latvia) politicians
Prime Ministers of Latvia
Ministers of Finance of Latvia
Ministers of Justice of Latvia
Members of the 2nd State Duma of the Russian Empire
Members of the People's Council of Latvia
Deputies of the 2nd Saeima
Deputies of the 3rd Saeima
Deputies of the 4th Saeima
Candidates for President of Latvia
Recipients of the Order of the Three Stars